Desulfuromonas acetoxidans is a species of bacteria. It is strictly anaerobic, rod-shaped, laterally flagellated and Gram-negative. It is unable to ferment organic substances; it obtains energy for growth by anaerobic sulfur respiration.

References

Further reading

External links
 Geobacter Project
Type strain of Desulfuromonas acetoxidans at BacDive -  the Bacterial Diversity Metadatabase

Desulfuromonadales
Bacteria described in 1976